SallyAnn Mosey is a reporter, fill in anchor, and weekend meteorologist for News 12 New Jersey. She was a meteorologist for the FOX owned-and-operated television station WTXF-TV in Philadelphia. Mosey served as meteorologist on the station's popular weekday morning show Good Day Philadelphia from 4:30 a.m. to 10 a.m., as well as weekday mornings on Fox 29 News at Eleven from October 2011 until December 2011.  Mosey was free-lancing at the station during that station's search for a meteorologist.  She made her final broadcast for WTXF on February 29, 2012. She has also presented feature stories on a wide variety of family life issues and topics in-studio and in the field for Good Day Prior to joining WTXF in 2009, Mosey was a meteorologist at the NBC flagship station, WNBC-TV, in New York City on Weekend Today in New York, where she reported in-studio as well as traveling the metropolitan area for three years, broadcasting live features and weather forecasts from the most popular events in the region.

Before moving to New York, Mosey was the weekend weathercaster and a reporter for WPVI-TV in Philadelphia for eight years. Previously, she had been weekday weather anchor and reporter at WTNH-TV in New Haven, Connecticut, where she earned an Emmy Award nomination for general news reporting. She started her television career in her native Buffalo, New York with WGRZ-TV.

Personal life

Mosey graduated the State University of New York at Buffalo cum laude with a bachelor's degree in English/Communications and holds the American Meteorological Society (AMS) seal of approval. She currently lives in Monmouth County, New Jersey with her husband and four children. SallyAnn was WNBC's weekend meteorologist from 2006 to 2009.

References

External links
 WNBC Biography

Television personalities from Buffalo, New York
People from Holmdel Township, New Jersey
American television journalists
American women television journalists
Television anchors from Philadelphia
Philadelphia television reporters
Television anchors from New York City
American television meteorologists
Television meteorologists from New York (state)
Television meteorologists in New York City
New York (state) television reporters
Living people
University at Buffalo alumni
Scientists from New York (state)
Year of birth missing (living people)
21st-century American women